Psary-Kąty  is a village in the administrative district of Gmina Bodzentyn, within Kielce County, Świętokrzyskie Voivodeship, in south-central Poland.

The village has a population of 510.

From 1974 at Psary-Kąty, there was a large satellite ground station (Centrum Usług Satelitarnych), operated by Telekomunikacja Polska, with up to seven large parabolic antennas. It was closed on 31 July 2010 due to decreasing interest in satellite voice transmission.

References

Villages in Kielce County